Alfred Dearlove (3 August 1869 – 17 March 1955) was an English cricketer. He played for Gloucestershire between 1895 and 1900.

References

1869 births
1955 deaths
English cricketers
Gloucestershire cricketers
Cricketers from Bristol